A police voucher is a grant of a certain amount of taxpayer-provided funds to individual citizens (or groups of citizens), to be used to purchase private police services from one or more vendors of their choice. 

It can represent a partial privatization of the police function commonly provided by government, by facilitating a situation in which government still funds – but no longer directly produces – police services.

References

Law enforcement